The 2014 Città di Como Challenger – Singles is a part of the 2014 Città di Como Challenger. It was a professional tennis tournament played on clay courts and was a part of the 2014 ATP Challenger Tour. Viktor Troicki won the singles title by beating Louk Sorensen 6–3, 6–2

Seeds

Draw

Finals

Top half

Bottom half

References

 Main Draw
 Qualifying Draw

Citta di Como Challenger - Singles
2014 Singles
ATP Challenger Tour